The 1994 Sabah state election was held between Friday, 18 February and Saturday, 19 February 1994. Nomination day was 7 February 1994. The election was one of the most controversial election in Sabah's political history. The election was won by the incumbent ruling party (although the opposition at federal level) Parti Bersatu Sabah (PBS), winning 25 state electorates against 23 won by the federal government's ruling Barisan Nasional coalition.

Contesting parties
Before the election, PBS had already produced 2 splinters, SAPP (contesting for the first time) and AKAR, both which had contested under BN banner. LDP would also contest under BN.

This was the first Sabah state election to feature peninsula-based party United Malays National Organisation (UMNO). UMNO Sabah was born of the merger between United Sabah National Organisation (USNO) and Sabah People's United Front (BERJAYA) in 1991, as a party to counter PBS influence in Sabah.

Other parties contesting included SETIA, BERSEKUTU, DAP, PAS and independent candidates.

Results

Aftermath
As per stated above, PBS won the election by a tight margin. PBS president Joseph Pairin Kitingan was sworn in as chief minister of Sabah, his fourth time, on 21 February 1994, together with the state EXCO members. However, only two months later, as a result of defections by elected PBS assemblymen to BN, Pairin was forced to resign on 17 March 1994, and PBS was forced out of power, resulting in BN forming government in Sabah. Sakaran Dandai, leader of UMNO and BN in Sabah, was sworn in as the new Chief Minister on the same day.

Bernard Dompok, the former PBS vice-president, formed Parti Demokratik Sabah (PDS) with 18 assemblymen (PDS later changed name to UPKO). Joseph Kurup left PBS and formed Parti Bersatu Rakyat Sabah (PBRS). Jeffery Kitingan, Pairin's brother, also left PBS and joined Angkatan Keadilan Rakyat (AKAR). All of these parties stated their support to BN, and later joined BN. As a result of these defections, PBS was left with 5 seats. 

The outcome of this election and the defections resulted in the term katak being coined in, the literal meaning of which is "frog", due to the actions of PBS members "jumping" to another political party.

CM rotation system

After BN regains power in Sabah, it introduced Chief Minister rotation system between Muslim bumiputera, Non-Muslim bumiputera, and Chinese leaders for two year tenure each. This was one of the promises of BN during the election campaign. Sakaran only become CM for less than one year before resigning and accepting the Yang di-Pertua Negeri Sabah role on 1 January 1995; Salleh Said Keruak replaced him. Yong Teck Lee of SAPP then becomes CM from 1996 to 1998, before Bernard Dompok took the CM role from 1998 to 1999, when the Sabah Assembly was dissolved to make way for the state election on February that year.

See also
 2009 Perak constitutional crisis

Further reading
  James Chin. Sabah State Election of 1994: End of Kadazan Unity, Asian Survey, Vol. 34, No. 10, 1994, pp. 904–915

References

1994 elections in Malaysia
1994